The Shiriana (sometimes called the Xiriâna) are a Native American tribe of Brazil with a current population of approximately 1,000.  They speak the Shiriana language, and are primarily animists.  Most live in the Brazilian state of Amazonas, but there are small groups living as well in Venezuela, near the Demeni and the Rio Negro.

References

Ethnic groups in Brazil
Indigenous peoples in Brazil